Cheng Yuelei (born 28 October 1987 in Beijing) is a Chinese footballer who currently plays for Meizhou Hakka in the Chinese Super League.

Club career
Cheng Yuelei began his football career at Sichuan Guancheng in 2001 when he joined their youth team and he would eventually progress to the senior team in 2005. He was included in several first team squads, however before he was given a chance to establish himself within the club, the team disbanded. Nevertheless, Cheng moved to the league champions Dalian Shide the following season, yet he saw his development digress when he was excluded from their first team squad and dropped to the reserves. He then transferred to Beijing Guoan and saw himself fight for the second choice goalkeeping position with Zhang Sipeng throughout much of the 2008 season.

At the beginning of the 2009 season, Cheng transferred to Shenzhen Ruby and after several games, he was chosen as their first choice goalkeeper when he made his debut against Shaanxi Chanba on 4 April 2009 in a 2-1 win For the next two seasons, Cheng would go on to be vital member at the club where they were midtable regulars until Philippe Troussier became their manager and after a series of defeats, he decided to drop Cheng for Zhang Xunwei during the 2011 season as the club was relegated from the first tier. Because Cheng was still considered a promising goalkeeper, he would join recently promoted Guangzhou R&F on a five-year contract at the beginning of the 2012 season.

Cheng was Guangzhou R&F's main keeper over the 2012-2019 seasons with the exception of 2015 when Liu Dianzuo played more games. By the end of the 2019 season, Cheng had played 200 games for Guangzhou R&F. However, he didn't play a single league minute in 2020 as U21 player Han Jiaqi became first choice goalkeeper.

International career
Cheng was called up to the Chinese national team to play against New Zealand on 25 March 2011 and he made his debut by coming on as an early substitute for injured goalkeeper Zeng Cheng in a 1-1 draw. Cheng would then go on to make his first start for the team soon afterwards by starting in a friendly against Honduras on 29 March 2011 in a 3-0 victory.

Career statistics 
Statistics accurate as of match played 31 December 2022.

References

External links
 
 
Player stats at sohu.com
Profile at weltfussball.at

1987 births
Living people
Chinese footballers
Footballers from Beijing
Sichuan Guancheng players
Dalian Shide F.C. players
Beijing Guoan F.C. players
Shenzhen F.C. players
Association football goalkeepers
China international footballers
Guangzhou City F.C. players
Chinese Super League players